Prest is a surname. Notable people with the surname include:

Agnes Prest, English Protestant martyr
Arthur Prest, Nigerian politician
Bill Prest, Australian politician
Cedar Prest, Australian artist
Charles Prest, English cricketer
Edward Prest, English cricketer
Edward Prest (priest), British archdeacon
Harold Prest, English cricketer
John Prest, British historian
Martín Prest, Argentine footballer
Sid Prest, Canadian politician
Steve Prest, English snooker player
Thomas Peckett Prest, British writer
Tommy Prest, English footballer
Warren Prest, Australian rules footballer
Wilfrid Prest, Australian academic
William Prest, English cricketer and footballer
William Prest (Cambridgeshire cricketer), English cricketer

See also
Prest (disambiguation)
Prest family